This article is a list of G.I. Joe: A Real American Hero episodes. It covers the Sunbow/Marvel 1985 series and movie, as well as the DiC 1989 series.

Sunbow/Marvel series (1983–1986)

Miniseries #1 (1983)

Miniseries #2 (1984)

Season 1 (1985)

Season 2 (1986)

G.I. Joe: The Movie (1987) 

G.I. Joe: The Movie is a 1987 animated feature film. It was released on home video on April 20, 1987, and later aired in syndication, both as a full-length film and as a series of five episodes. With detailed visuals in Toei Animation's typical animated feature film styling, the film has a decidedly darker tone than the television series. The plot revolves around the introduction of Cobra-La, and their plans to steal a device allowing them to transform all human life into serpent creatures. The film also reveals Cobra Commander's cartoon origin, and features the animated debuts of several members of the G.I. Joe Team, most notably Chuckles, Falcon, Law & Order, Jinx, Tunnel Rat and Mercer.

DIC series (1989–1992)

Miniseries (1989)
To prove this series is a continuation of the Sunbow series, a modified version of the old theme song is used.

Season 1 (1990–1991)

Season 2 (1991–1992)
A notable change in this season is Cobra Commander goes back to his classic hood; abandoning the uniform Copperhead gave him in "Dragonfire".

External links
 G.I. Joe: The M.A.S.S. Device Episode List at the Internet Movie Database
 G.I. Joe: The Revenge of Cobra Episode List at the Internet Movie Database
 G.I. Joe (Sunbow) Episode List at the Internet Movie Database
 G.I. Joe: Operation Dragonfire Episode List at the Internet Movie Database
 G.I. Joe (DiC) Episode List at the Internet Movie Database

 
Lists of American children's animated television series episodes